Ogilvie is a surname of Scottish origin. It may also refer to:

People
Ogilvie (name)

Places

Australia
Ogilvie, Western Australia

Canada
Ogilvie, Nova Scotia
Ogilvie Aerodrome, Yukon
Ogilvie Mountains, a mountain range in Yukon

Scotland
Ogilvie, Angus near Glamis

United States
Ogilvie, Minnesota
Ogilvie Transportation Center, a commuter-rail terminal in Chicago, Illinois

Education
John Ogilvie High School, Hamilton, Scotland
Ogilvie High School, Hobart, Tasmania
Ogilvie Institute, Catholic college in Aberdeen, Scotland

Other
Ogilvie syndrome, a medical condition
 Surname of a minor character in Dashiell Hammett's The Main Death

See also
Ogilvy (disambiguation)

Surnames of Scottish origin